An Ice horn, regional named as Ice nose, Ice cutter  is a triangular ship constructional part at the stern of a ship. It serves the helm of the ship to protect against unbroken and broken ice, especially when driving astern. The arrangement of the Ice horn should preferably be located in the design waterline.

Pictures

Notes

Bibliography 
 K. Schwitalla, Ulrich Scharnow: Lexikon der Seefahrt. 1988, transpress VEB Verlag für Verkehrswesen Berlin, . page 131 (German)

Nautical terminology